Mariano Gottifredi (29 August 1930 – 8 February 2020) was an Italian rower. He competed at the 1968 Summer Olympics and the 1972 Summer Olympics.

References

External links
 

1930 births
2020 deaths
Italian male rowers
Olympic rowers of Italy
Rowers at the 1968 Summer Olympics
Rowers at the 1972 Summer Olympics
Sportspeople from the Province of Como